Pauline Chaponnière-Chaix (Geneva, 1 November 1850 – Geneva, 6 December 1934) was a Swiss nurse, feminist and suffragette. She was one of four employees of the International Committee of the Red Cross after World War I, and served as president of the International Council of Women during the period of 1920–22.

References

Bibliography

1850 births
1934 deaths
Swiss nurses
Swiss feminists
People from Geneva
Swiss suffragists